Dechert LLP is an American multinational law firm of more than 900 lawyers with practices in corporate and securities, complex litigation, finance and real estate, financial services, asset management, and private equity. In 2021, the firm raised revenues by 25%, with a total of $1.3 billion.

History
The firm's first predecessor, MacVeagh & Bispham, was formed in 1875 by Wayne MacVeagh and George Tucker Bispham. MacVeagh previously served as United States Ambassador to Turkey, and Bispham authored the treatise "Principles of Equity," which was considered the definitive work on the subject at the time. MacVeagh went on to become United States Attorney General under President James Garfield, and then United States Ambassador to Italy in 1893. Bispham went on to become a professor at University of Pennsylvania Law School in 1884.

The MacVeagh & Bispham's successor merged with another Philadelphia law firm, Dechert, Smith & Clark, in 1942. After undergoing several more name changes, the firm was known as Dechert Price & Rhoads for many years beginning in 1962, shortening its name to Dechert in 2000.

In the 2018 AmLaw Global 200 survey, Dechert ranked as the 43rd highest grossing law firm in the world. In the same year Dechert reached a settlement with two former staffers over claims that it discriminated against certain staff members because of their sex and age.
 Two former payroll staffers at Dechert filed a complaint against Dechert in 2017, claiming they experienced a culture of bias against older and/or female employees at the firm that led to their firing in 2016. They also alleged there was a “boys club at the firm that gave beneficial treatment to younger male employees. Previously, on the eve of trial, the law firm and former associate Ariel Ayanna reached an eleventh-hour deal in a ‘Macho culture' retaliation case The attorney had claimed big-league firm Dechert fired him to get back at him for taking time off to care for his mentally ill wife and their newborn, the National Law Journal reported.

Financial Times ranked Dechert in the Top 10 Most Innovative Law Firms in 2019. In 2021, Dechert ranked 5th for the same recognition. Dechert and administrative services provider for the international law firm agreed in the same year to settle claims by a former site manager in Washington D.C. that he was subjected to discrimination and retaliation because he had a stroke, federal court records show.

In 2022, Dechert’s UK unit agreed to pay £20 Million to a former client for compensations for damages caused by its former UK partner and white-collar crime head Neil Gerrard.The UK High Court found Neil Gerrard committed ‘gross and knowing breach of duty’ as he leaked confidential documents of his client.

Furthermore, the UK Dechert unit was sued by former partner Monica Gogn for workplace discrimination due to race and sex. The employment tribunal filing document stated that the proceedings levelled against “Dechert LLP & Others” “dismissed following a withdrawal of the claim by the claimant”.

Pro bono activities
Dechert has been recognized among the top 10 U.S. law firms for pro bono work in The American Lawyer'''s Pro Bono Survey, an annual report which rates the nation's 200 highest grossing law firms based on their level of pro bono activity. The report confirmed that it remained the top law firm for international pro bono work. In August 2014, Dechert received the American Bar Association Pro Bono Publico Award.

In 2020, Dechert received the ABA Business Law Section National Public Service Award. In 2021, the firm was rated #1 for international pro bono work by The American Lawyer''.

Notable lawyers and alumni

Harvey Bartle III, chief judge of the United States District Court Eastern District of Pennsylvania
Joseph S. Clark, mayor of Philadelphia (1952–56) and United States senator for Pennsylvania (1957–69)
Q. Todd Dickinson, former Under Secretary of Commerce for Intellectual Property
Steven Engel, deputy assistant attorney general in the Office of Legal Counsel under George W. Bush and United States Assistant Attorney General for the Office of Legal Counsel in the Donald Trump administration
Glenn Fine, former inspector general for the U.S. Department of Justice
Miriam González Durántez, head of international trade practice
Paul G. Haaga, Jr., vice chairman of Capital Research and Management Company, a constituent company of the Capital Group Companies
David N. Kelley, former United States Attorney and Deputy U.S. Attorney for the United States District Court for the Southern District of New York
Cheryl Ann Krause, United States Circuit Judge of the United States Court of Appeals for the Third Circuit
Noyes Leech (1921–2010), law professor at the University of Pennsylvania Law School
Scooter Libby, chief of staff to Vice President Dick Cheney (2001–2005)
Edward A. McDonald, portrayed himself as a federal prosecutor in Martin Scorsese's "Goodfellas"
Mary A. McLaughlin, judge for the United States District Court Eastern District of Pennsylvania
Lisa Scottoline, New York Times best-selling author
Norma Levy Shapiro, first woman partner and retired judge for the United States District Court Eastern District of Pennsylvania
Arlen Specter, United States senator for Pennsylvania (1981–2011)

See also
List of largest United States-based law firms by profits per partner

References

External links
 
 
 Profile from LexisNexis Martindale-Hubbell

Intellectual property law firms
Biopharmaceutical law firms
Law firms based in Philadelphia
Law firms established in 1875
1875 establishments in Pennsylvania
Foreign law firms with offices in Hong Kong
Partnerships